Events in the year 2020 in Denmark.

Incumbents
 Monarch – Margrethe II
 Prime Minister – Mette Frederiksen

Events
100 years since the reunification between North Schleswig (South Jutland) and Denmark.
250 years since the introduction of Freedom of the press in Denmark-Norway.

April
April 15 – COVID-19 pandemic: Denmark partially lifts its lockdown rules, allowing children up to age 11 to return to school.

Culture

Film
 12 December  Another Round wins the awards for Best Film, Best Director (Thomas Vinterberg), Best Screenwriter, (Thomas Vinterberg and Tobias Lindholm) and Best Actor /Mads Mikkelsen) at the 33rd European Film Awards.

Sports

Badminton
 15 March – Viktor Axelsen wins a gold medal in Men's Single at 2020 All England Open.
 1317 October 2020 Denmark Open takes place in Odense.
 Anders Antonsen wins gold in men's single

Boxing
 1 February – Sarah Mahfoud is new IBF world champion in featherweight after defeating Brenda Carabajal

Cycling
 26 February  Denmark wins a gold medal in Men's team pursuit at the 2020 UCI Track Cycling World Championships.
 1 March  Denmark wins a gold medal in Men's Madison at the 2020 UCI Track Cycling World Championships.
 17 August  Cecilie Uttrup Ludwig wins Giro dell'Emilia Internazionale Donne Elite
 11 October 
 Casper Pedersen wins the 2020 Paris–Tours.
 Mads Pedersen wins the 2020 Gent–Wevelgem.

Rowing
 11 October – Sverri Sandberg Nielsen wins gold in smen's ingle sculler at the 2020 European Rowing Championships.

Future events
3 to 20 December – The 2020 European Women's Handball Championship is scheduled to be held in Denmark and Norway.

Deaths

11 January – Tom Belsø, motor racing driver (b. 1942).
29 June – Svend Aage Rask, footballer (b. 1935).
20 July – Lone Dybkjær, politician (b. 1940).
28 July – Bent Fabric, pianist and composer (b. 1924).
22 August – Ulla Pia, singer (b. 1945)
 November  Allan Botschinsky. kazz mus8ician

References

 
Years of the 21st century in Denmark
Denmark
Denmark
2020s in Denmark